Galanta District (okres Galanta) is a district in the Trnava Region of western Slovakia. The district lies on the lowland area. 
Through the district area flows River Váh and its level is regulated by dam in Kráľová nad Váhom. Historically the economy of the district area had relied on agriculture, now the production of white goods is of utmost importance. The district center is its largest town Galanta and there are 36 municipalities, in three of them are towns.
The Hungarian composer Zoltán Kodály spent most of his childhood in Galanta and composed the Dances of Galánta (1933, for orchestra) based on the folk music of this region.

Municipalities

References

External links 
 Official site

Districts of Slovakia
Trnava Region